Miloš Malenović (born 14 January 1985 in Belgrade) is a Serbian-born Swiss football player who most recently played in the Netherlands for BV Veendam.

References

1985 births
Living people
Footballers from Belgrade
Swiss men's footballers
Association football forwards
Grasshopper Club Zürich players
FC Wohlen players
FC St. Gallen players
Neuchâtel Xamax FCS players
Almere City FC players
FC Emmen players
SC Veendam players
Swiss Super League players
Eerste Divisie players
Serbian emigrants to Switzerland
Swiss expatriate footballers
Expatriate footballers in the Netherlands
Swiss expatriate sportspeople in the Netherlands